Biogasoline, or biopetrol (British English), is a type of gasoline produced from biomass such as algae. Like traditionally produced gasoline, it is made up of hydrocarbons with 6 (hexane) to 12 (dodecane) carbon atoms per molecule and can be used in internal combustion engines. Biogasoline is chemically different from biobutanol and bioethanol, as these are alcohols, not hydrocarbons.

Companies are developing approaches to take triglyceride inputs and, through a process of deoxygenation and reforming (cracking, isomerizing, aromatizing, and producing cyclic molecules), produce biogasoline. This biogasoline is intended to match the chemical, kinetic, and combustion characteristics of its petroleum counterpart, but with much higher octane levels. Others are pursuing similar approaches based on hydrotreating. Still others are focusing on using woody biomass and enzymatic processes.

Structure and properties

BG100, or 100% biogasoline, is formulated so that it can immediately be used as a drop-in substitute for petroleum-derived gasoline in any conventional gasoline engine, and can be distributed in the same fueling infrastructure, as the properties match traditional gasoline from petroleum. Dodecane requires a small percentage of octane booster to match gasoline. Ethanol fuel (E85) requires specialised fuel systems and has lower combustion energy and corresponding fuel economy.

Biogasoline's chemical similarities allow it to be fully miscible with regular gasoline. Biogasoline is also formulated to not require fuel system modifications, unlike ethanol.

Comparison to common fuels

Production 

Biogasoline is created by turning sugar directly into gasoline. In late March 2010, the world’s first biogasoline demonstration plant was started in Madison, WI by Virent Energy Systems, Inc. Virent discovered and developed a technique called Aqueous Phase Reforming (APR) in 2001. APR includes many processes including reforming to generate hydrogen, dehydrogenation of alcohols/hydrogenation of carbonyls, deoxygenation reactions, hydrogenolysis and cyclization. The input for APR is a carbohydrate solution created from plant material, and the product is a mixture of chemicals and oxygenated hydrocarbons. From there, the materials go through further conventional chemical processing to yield the final result: a mixture of non-oxygenated hydrocarbons that they claimed was cost-effective. These hydrocarbons are the exact hydrocarbons found in petroleum fuels, which is why today’s cars do not need to be altered to run on biogasoline. The only difference is in origin. Petroleum based fuels are made from oil, and biogasoline is made from plants such as beets and sugarcane or cellulosic biomass which would normally be plant waste.

Diesel fuel is made up of linear hydrocarbons. These are long straight carbon atom chains. They differ from the shorter, branched hydrocarbons that make up gasoline. In 2014, researchers used a feedstock of levulinic acid to create biogasoline. Levulinic acid is derived from cellulose material, such as corn stalks, straw or other plant waste. That waste does not have to be fermented. The fuel-making process is reportedly inexpensive and offers yields of over 60 percent.

Research

Research is conducted in both the academic and private sectors.

Academic 
Virginia Polytechnic Institute and State University has been researching the production of stable biogasoline in current oil refineries. Their focus of the research was the length of time bio-oil’s shelf-life. The use of catalysts was used in order to remove impurities from the processed plant sugars. The researchers extended the time from three months to over a year.

Iowa State University researchers use a type of fermentation in their research. They first start by forming a gaseous mixture and pyrolyze it. The result of the pyrolysis is bio-oil, of which the sugar-rich portion is fermented and distilled to create water and ethanol, while the high-acetate portion is separated into biogasoline, water, and biomass.

Private 
Virent Energy Systems, Inc., in conjunction with Marathon Petroleum, has developed a technique to turn plant sugars from wheat straw, corn stalks, and sugarcane pulp into biogasoline. The sugars are converted into hydrocarbons similar to those in regular gasoline by the use of catalysts.

Economic viability and future
One of the major problems facing the economic viability of biogasoline is the high up-front cost. Research groups are finding that current investment groups are impatient with the pace of biogasoline progress. In addition, environmental groups may demand that biogasoline that is produced in a way that protects wildlife, especially fish. A research group studying the economic viability of biofuels found that current techniques of production and high costs of production will prevent biogasoline from being accessible to the general public. The group determined that the price of biogasoline would need to be approximately $800 per barrel, which they determine as unlikely with current production costs. Another problem inhibiting the success of biogasoline is the lack of tax relief. The government is providing tax relief for ethanol fuels but has yet to offer tax relief for biogasoline. This makes biogasoline a much less attractive option to consumers. Lastly, producing biogasoline could have a large effect on the farming industry. If biogasoline became a serious alternative, a large percentage of existing arable land would be converted to grow crops solely for biogasoline. This could decrease the amount of land used to farm food for human consumption and may decrease overall feedstock. This would cause an increase in overall food cost.

While there may be some problems facing the economic viability of biogasoline, the partnership between Royal Dutch Shell and Virent Energy Systems, Inc., a bioscience firm based in Madison, WI, to further research biogasoline is an encouraging sign for biogasoline’s future. In addition, many nations are enacting policies that increase the use of biogasoline within the country to help curb the cost of fossil fuels and create more energy independence. Current efforts by the partnership are focused on improving the technology and making it available for large-scale production.

See also 
 Algae fuel
 Bioplastic
 Butanol fuel

References

External links 
 Biogasoline Yahoo Group

Research institutes
 Breaking the Chemical and Engineering Barriers to Lignocellulosic Biofuels: Workshop participants list

Biofuels